"September Song" is an American standard popular song composed by Kurt Weill with lyrics by Maxwell Anderson. It was introduced by Walter Huston in the 1938 Broadway musical production Knickerbocker Holiday. The song has been recorded by numerous singers and instrumentalists.

Origins
The song originated from Walter Huston's request that he should have one solo song in Knickerbocker Holiday if he was to play the role of the aged governor of New Netherland, Peter Stuyvesant. Anderson and Weill wrote the song in a couple of hours for Huston's gruff voice and limited vocal range.

Knickerbocker Holiday was roughly based on Washington Irving's Knickerbocker's History of New York set in New Amsterdam in 1647. It is a political allegory criticizing the policies of the New Deal through the portrayal of a semi–fascist government of New Amsterdam, with a corrupt governor and councilmen. It also involves a love triangle with a young woman forced to marry the governor Peter Stuyvesant while loving another. The musical closed in April 1939 after a six-month run.

Lyric content
In "September Song", a man now recognizes the "plentiful waste of time" of earlier days, and in the "long, long while from May to December", having reached September, he is looking forward to spending the precious days of autumn with his loved one.

Chart recordings
Frank Sinatra's 1946 version reached No.8 on the Billboard charts that year.
Ian McCulloch, of Echo & the Bunnymen, released a version of the song as his debut solo single (backed with a rendition of "Molly Malone") which reached number 51 on the UK Singles Chart in 1984.

Use in other media
"September Song" was used as diegetic music in the 1950 film September Affair. The song is used in the 1987 Woody Allen film Radio Days; Allen has stated that the song may be the best American popular song ever written.

See also
List of 1930s jazz standards

References

External links
 Lyrics of the 1938 version
 Lyrics of 1965 version by Frank Sinatra

1938 songs
1939 singles
1930s jazz standards
Songs with music by Kurt Weill
Frank Sinatra songs
Ian McCulloch (singer) songs
Columbia Records singles
Pop standards
Songs from musicals
Songs about old age